Alexander Grant may refer to:

The arts
 Alex da Kid (Alexander Grant, born 1982), English hip-hop producer
 Alex Grant (musician) (born 1974), bass guitarist for Idlewild and DeSalvo
 Alex Grant (poet), Scottish-American poet, teacher
 Alexander Grant (dancer) (1925–2011), founding member of the Birmingham Royal Ballet

Politicians

Canada 
 Alexander Grant (Upper Canada politician) (1734–1813), Canadian politician, Lieutenant Governor of Upper Canada
 Alexander Grant Dallas (1816-1882) Chief Factor in the Hudson's Bay Company
 Alexander Grant (Nova Scotia politician) (1830–1900), merchant and politician in Nova Scotia
 Alexander James Grant (1829–1909), Canadian politician
 Alexander Grant MacKay (1860-1920), Canadian politician

United Kingdom 
 Sir Alexander Grant, 8th Baronet (1782–1854), British Member of Parliament
 Sir Alexander Grant, 5th Baronet (1705–1772), British Member of Parliament for Inverness Burghs
 Alexander Grant (died 1719) (c. 1673–1719), Member of the 1st Parliament of Great Britain
 Alexander Grant (British Army officer) (1775–1827), army officer and colonial commandant in the Gambia

United States
 Alexander Grant (Massachusetts politician) (1853–1935), Massachusetts machinist and politician
 Alexander R. Grant (1925–2001), Wisconsin politician

Sportspeople
 Alec Grant (1893–1966), New Zealand cricketer
 Alex Grant (soccer) (born 1994), English-born Australian football (soccer) player
 Alex Grant (ice hockey) (born 1989), ice hockey player
 Alexander Grant (athlete) (1875–1946), American track and field athlete who competed at the 1900 Summer Olympics
 Alexander McGregor Grant (1888–1973), Australian rules footballer, New Zealand surgeon, horse-racing administrator, racehorse owner and breeder
 Lex Grant (born 1962), Scottish footballer

Other
 Sir Alexander Grant, 1st Baronet (1864–1937), creator of recipe for McVitie's digestive biscuit, managing director of firm and benefactor to National Library of Scotland
 Sir Alexander Grant, 10th Baronet (1826–1884), principal of the University of Edinburgh
 Alexander John Grant (1693-1727), Roman Catholic clergyman
 Alexander Grant McLean (1824-1862), Surveyor General of New South Wales
 Surgeon-Major Alexander Grant (IMS) (1817–1900), surgeon in the Indian Medical Service
 Alexander Grant Ruthven (1882-1971) President of the University of Michigan
Lewis Alexander Grant-Ogilvy (1767-1840), 5th Earl of Seafield